Cenk İldem (born January 5, 1986, in Şişli, Istanbul) is a male wrestler from Turkey competing in the 96 kg division of Greco-Roman style. He is a member of the İstanbul Büyükşehir Belediyesi S.K., where he is coached by his father Hüseyin İldem.

Personal life
His father Hüseyin İldem was a wrestler of Greco-Romen style competing in the 74 kg division for the national team in the years 1980–90. Cenk İldem began with wrestling at the age of ten, with his father's encouragement. Hüseyin İldem coaches his son since then. Cenk's younger brother Kansu also competes in wrestling.

Cenk İldem studied physical education and sports at Niğde University. Since 2007, he serves as a teacher at Şişli Industrial Vocational High School in Istanbul.

He married in 2011.

Achievements
Cenk İldem is winner of several medals in junior and senior class at European as well as world level. He won the gold medal at the World Junior Wrestling Championships in 2006 held in Guatemala City, Guatemala. He became gold medalist at the 2005 European Junior Wrestling Championships held in Hungary and again in 2006 in Poland.

He won the bronze medal at the 2010 European Wrestling Championships in Baku, Azerbaijan and repeated his success in bronze at the 2013 European Wrestling Championships held in Tbilisi, Georgia.

He became bronze medalist at the 2011 World Wrestling Championships in Istanbul, Turkey.

Cenk İldem represented his country at the 2012 Summer Olympics without advancing to the finals.

At 2016 European Wrestling Championships he won bronze medal.

In 2019, he won the bronze medal in the men's Greco-Roman 97 kg event at the 2019 World Wrestling Championships held in Nur-Sultan, Kazakhstan.

In 2021, he won one of the bronze medals in the men's 97 kg event at the Matteo Pellicone Ranking Series 2021 held in Rome, Italy.

References

External links 
 

Living people
1986 births
Turkish male sport wrestlers
Sportspeople from Istanbul
Olympic wrestlers of Turkey
Wrestlers at the 2012 Summer Olympics
People from Şişli
Niğde University alumni
Turkish schoolteachers
European Games medalists in wrestling
European Games bronze medalists for Turkey
Wrestlers at the 2015 European Games
World Wrestling Championships medalists
Wrestlers at the 2016 Summer Olympics
Olympic bronze medalists for Turkey
Medalists at the 2016 Summer Olympics
Olympic medalists in wrestling
Mediterranean Games silver medalists for Turkey
Mediterranean Games medalists in wrestling
Competitors at the 2013 Mediterranean Games
Wrestlers at the 2019 European Games
European Wrestling Championships medalists
Wrestlers at the 2020 Summer Olympics
21st-century Turkish people